Thomas Stilwell House is a historic home located at Glens Falls, Warren County, New York.  It was built about 1875 and is a rectangular, two and one half-story, frame residence with a gable roof and sheathed in clapboards.  It features a raised, bracketed one-story porch with balustrade and ornate scroll-sawed fretwork.  It is representative of a modest transitional Italianate – Eastlake style.

It was added to the National Register of Historic Places in 1984.

References

Houses on the National Register of Historic Places in New York (state)
Queen Anne architecture in New York (state)
Italianate architecture in New York (state)
Houses completed in 1875
Houses in Warren County, New York
National Register of Historic Places in Warren County, New York